The National Health Planning and Resources Development Act, or Public Law 93-641 is a piece of 1974 American Congressional legislation.  Many Certificate of Need programs trace their origin to the act which offered incentives for states to implement these programs.

Details of the Act

In this Act, three distinct existing programs were consolidated:
Hill-Burton
Regional Medical Program
Comprehensive Health Planning Act

Congress realized that the provision of federal funds for the construction of new health care facilities was contributing to increasing health care costs by generating duplication of facilities.

The intent of Congress in passing this Act was to create throughout the United States, a strengthened and improved federal-, state- and area-wide system of health planning and resources development that would help provide solutions to several identified problems.

The perceived problems the Act was intended to address were as follows: 
 lack of equal access to quality health care at reasonable cost 
 infusion of federal funds into the health care system was contributing to inflationary health care costs while failing to produce an adequate supply or distribution of health resources 
 the lack of a comprehensive, rational approach by the public and private sectors to creation of uniformly effective methods of delivering health care
 misdistribution of health care facilities and manpower  
 increasing and uncontrolled inflation of health care costs, particularly the costs associated with hospital stays
 inadequate incentives for the use of alternative levels of health care and the substitution of ambulatory and intermediate care for inpatient hospital care  
 the lack of basic knowledge regarding proper personal health care and methods for effective use of available health services in large segments of the population

This legislation was also intended to encourage health care providers to play an active role in developing health policy.

References

External links
Bill summary

1974 in law
United States federal health legislation